Sandys is a surname of Old English origin. It is an older spelling of Sands, and is now usually pronounced as such.

People with the surname
 Anthony Frederick Augustus Sandys (1829–1904), British Pre-Raphaelite painter, aka Frederic Sandys
 Charles Sandys (1786–1859), English antiquarian 
 Charles Sandys (captain), captain of the HMS Dido (1784)
 Duncan Sandys (1908–1987), British politician
 Edwin Sandys (disambiguation), several individuals:
 Edwin Sandys (bishop) (1519–1588)
 Edwin Sandys (died 1629) (1561–1629)
 Edwin Sandys (died 1608) (–1608)
 Edwin Sandys (died 1623) (1591–1623)
 Edwin Sandys (MP for Worcestershire) (1659–1699)
 Edwin Sandys, 2nd Baron Sandys (1726–1797)
 Edwina Sandys (born 1938), British artist
 Elspeth Sandys (born 1940), New Zealand author
 Emma Sandys (1843–1877), English painter
 George Sandys (1577–1644)
 George John Sandys (1875–1937), British diplomat
 Henry Sandys (disambiguation), several individuals:
 Henry Sandys (MP) (–1640)
 Henry Sandys, 5th Baron Sandys (died 1644), English nobleman and Cavalier officer
 John Sandys (disambiguation), several individuals:
 John Sandys (–1586), Roman Catholic priest and martyr
 John Sandys (MP), late 14th-century member of parliament for Hampshire
 John Sandys (classicist) (1844–1922), British classical scholar
 Laura Sandys (born 1964), British politician
 Marcus Sandys, 3rd Baron Sandys (1798–1863)
 Mary Hill, Marchioness of Downshire née Sandys (1764–1836)
 Miles Sandys (disambiguation), several individuals:
 Miles Sandys (died 1601)
 Miles Sandys (died 1636)
 Sir Miles Sandys, 1st Baronet (1563–1645)
 Nehemiah Sandys of Sandfield, High Sheriff of Roscommon (1788)
 Robert Sandys, High Sheriff of Roscommon (1683, 1685)
 Samuel Sandys (disambiguation), several individuals:
 Samuel Sandys (died 1623) (1560–1623)
 Samuel Sandys (Royalist) (1615–1685)
 Samuel Sandys (died 1701) (–1701)
 Samuel Sandys, 1st Baron Sandys (1695–1770)
 Thomas Sandys (disambiguation), several individuals:
 Thomas Sandys, 2nd Baron Sandys (died 1560), English peer
 Thomas Sandys (MP for Gatton) (1600–1658), English politician
 Thomas Sandys (merchant) (fl. 1682–1683), English merchant, subject of the legal case East India Company v. Sandys
 Thomas Sandys (1837–1911), British army officer and politician
 Walter Sandys (disambiguation), several individuals:
 Walter Sandys (died 1435) (–1435)
 Walter Sandys (died 1609) (–1609)
 William Sandys (disambiguation), several individuals:
 William Sandys, 1st Baron Sandys (1470–1540), English diplomat
 William Sandys (waterworks engineer) (1607–1669), politician and navigational engineer
 William Sandys (antiquarian) (1792–1874), English antiquarian and Christmas carol collector

See also
 Baron Sandys
 Sandys baronets
 Sandy (surname)
 Sandys (disambiguation)

References

Surnames of Old English origin